Les Épines de Lespinet (2500 m²) is a private botanical garden specializing in cactus and succulents. It is located at 38, Les Hauts de Lespinet, Foix, Ariège, Midi-Pyrénées, France, and open by guided tours; an admission fee is charged.

The garden is intended to recreate a semi-desert American landscape amid banana, citrus, and Mediterranean vegetation. It contains nearly 400 taxa of cacti and succulents, primarily Agave, Opuntia, and Yucca, as well as Nolina and a collection of palm trees from temperate and subtropical regions.

See also 
 List of botanical gardens in France

References 
 Les Épines de Lespinet
 Culture.fr entry (French)
 Cactuspro entry (French)
 Parcs et Jardins de Midi-Pyrénées entry (French)

Gardens in Ariège (department)
Botanical gardens in France